The Margera family:

Bam Margera - Skateboarder and star of CKY, Jackass, and Viva La Bam.
Phil Margera - Bam's father and a baker by profession
April Margera - Bam's mother
Jess Margera - Bam's brother and drummer of the band CKY
Vincent "Don Vito" Margera - Bam's uncle

American families